The Harry F. Sinclair House is a mansion at the southeast corner of East 79th Street and Fifth Avenue on the Upper East Side of Manhattan in New York City. The house was built between 1897 and 1899. Over the first half of the 20th century, the house was successively the residence of businessmen Isaac D. Fletcher and Harry F. Sinclair, and then the descendants of Peter Stuyvesant, the last Director of New Netherland. The Ukrainian Institute of America acquired the home in 1955. After the house gradually fell into disrepair, the institute renovated the building in the 1990s. The house was added to the National Register of Historic Places (NRHP) and was named a National Historic Landmark in 1978.

The mansion was designed in an eclectic French Renaissance style by C. P. H. Gilbert and built by foreman Harvey Murdock. The building largely retains its original design, except for a tankhouse on the roof. Gilbert and Murdock constructed the bulk of the house with brick, which was then faced with limestone ashlar. The northern façade on 79th Street, containing the main entrance, is characterized by multiple windows in square recesses or semi-elliptical and fully Gothic arches. The western façade on Fifth Avenue is symmetrical and dominated by a curved, projecting pavilion. Critical reviews of the house's architecture over its history have been largely positive.

History 
In 1897, Isaac D. Fletcher, an industrialist and art collector, purchased a lot at the corner of Fifth Avenue and 79th Street for $200,000 from railroad businessman Henry H. Cook, who owned all lots on the city block between Fifth Avenue, Madison Avenue, and 78th and 79th Streets. Cook did not want the block to become populated with high-rises and only sold lots for the construction of private, first-class residences. Fletcher, who was planning a house on the block, hired architect C. P. H. Gilbert to design the abode. The house's design so impressed Fletcher that he commissioned a painting of the finished residence from Jean-François Raffaëlli in 1899.

Private residence 
Construction was undertaken by stonemason Harvey Murdock and was completed in 1899 at a total cost of $200,000. Fletcher died at the house in 1917, and in his will bequeathed the property to the Metropolitan Museum of Art. The museum sold the house the next year to oil magnate Harry F. Sinclair, who sold the house in 1930 to Augustus Stuyvesant Jr. and Anne van Horne Stuyvesant, the last direct descendants of Peter Stuyvesant, the final Dutch governor of New Netherland. The siblings resided in the mansion until their deaths in 1953 and 1938 respectively. A skylight above the staircase in the middle of the house was covered in the late 1940s.

Ukrainian Institute 
The executors of the Stuyvesant estate sold the Sinclair House in 1954 to a group of investors, who sold it in 1955 to the Ukrainian Institute of America (UIA), a nonprofit founded by Ukrainian businessman William Dzus in 1948 to promote Ukrainian culture. The UIA's purchase of the Sinclair House gave the structure a "temporary reprieve" from demolition, as described by Newsday; at the time, several other mansions on Fifth Avenue were being demolished. The mortgage on the building was repaid in 1962.

In 1977, the New York City Landmarks Preservation Commission designated the house as part of the Metropolitan Museum Historic District, a collection of 19th- and early 20th-century mansions around Fifth Avenue between 78th and 86th Streets. That June, the American Association for State and Local History filed paperwork with the National Park Service to nominate the Sinclair House for the National Register of Historic Places (NRHP). The next year, on June 2, 1978, it was added to the NRHP.

The UIA began repair work on the roof of the Sinclair House in late 1996 at an estimated cost of $250,000. In an interview with The New York Times that year, a member of the board described this work as an interim measure, as the building was in a poor state. At the time, the UIA was spending an estimated $150,000 annually on upkeep. During the renovation, one-fourth of the slate tiles were replaced and some drainage systems around the dormers were replaced. In November 2003, the US government made a matched grant of $270,000 to the UIA through the Save America's Treasures initiative to cover the costs of modernizing the building's electrical wiring and plumbing. The state government's Office of Parks, Recreation and Historic Preservation granted the UIA another $70,000 for restoration in June 2004. Because these were matched grants, the UIA was required to raise $340,000 on its own before accepting them. By July 2009, the UIA had completed improvements to the electrical wiring, installed a security system, replaced windows, and restored design elements. The skylight above the central stairs was also restored.

Architecture
The Sinclair House abuts the James B. Duke House and Payne Whitney House immediately to the south. The building is surrounded by a lawn, sunk into the ground, that is itself enclosed by a wrought iron fence, broken only by a stair and balustrade approaching the main entrance, on the north side.

The mansion was one of several ornate residences on the south side of 79th Street, which had been undeveloped until the end of the 19th century. It was designed in an eclectic French Renaissance style by C. P. H. Gilbert, who built several other mansions along Fifth Avenue. The foreman, Harvey Murdock, was also prolific both in the construction of private residences in Manhattan and Brooklyn, and had worked with Gilbert several times prior to the Sinclair House. The only additions to the building since its construction – a tankhouse on the roof and concrete arches to support a new roof for the penthouse – were made by Gilbert in the 1920s.

Gilbert and Murdock constructed the bulk of the mansion with brick, which was then faced with limestone ashlar. The north façade is characterized by multiple windows, housed in either square recesses or semi-elliptical and fully Gothic arches, and adorned variously with colonettes, ogee arches, and foliate reliefs around the glass. The main entrance is a frontispiece, a staple of French Renaissance homes, placed just to the left of the façade's center. It is made up of a portal that contains six wrought iron and glass doors, all fashioned in the Gothic Revival style. On top of the portal is a balcony, in front of a second-story window in a rectangular recess embellished with hanging crockets. The balustrades flanking the entrance and the balcony above it are decorated with images of seahorses. At the top of the façade are wall dormers, topped with pinnacles, upon a cornice that frames a mansard roof shingled in slate. At each corner on the cornice are small turrets ornamented with crockets and finials. To the left of the entrance is a three-sided bay window rising from the basement to the third floor, and to the left of that is a copper conservatory in a corner recess. The western façade is symmetrical and dominated by a curved, projecting pavilion, rising from the basement to the cornice. Every floor on the project has three windows, which again mix square frames and elliptical arches. Belt courses run along the entire façade, separating the floors and terminating at the corners with sculpted gargoyle heads.

The first three floors retain their original appearance, but not their original furnishings. The first floor is filled by a reception hall that separates the main entrance from the main staircase, at the south wall. Also on the first floor is a kitchen, a smaller, more enclosed staircase, and a pantry. The second floor is delineated into a ballroom and a dining hall, while the third has a library, master bedroom, originally Fletcher's wife's room, and a dressing room. The fourth floor, formerly occupied by Fletcher's bedroom and guest rooms, is now exhibit space but still contains two original marble bathtubs. The top two floors, within the mansard roof, have been transformed from servants' quarters into office space for the UIA's staff.

Critical reception
An 1899 article in the Real Estate Record and Guide generally praised the composition of the Sinclair House but noted that it had a rather ecclesiastical appearance and did not much resemble other, then-contemporary New York manors. Two years later, however, the same magazine characterized the house as being part of "the two best-developed blocks on upper Fifth Avenue", namely between 77th and 79th Streets, and by 1918 the magazine described the house as "one of the finest on the avenue".

John Strausbaugh, writing for The New York Times in 2007, described the Sinclair House as a "fairy-tale palace". The 2010 AIA Guide to New York City characterized the house as "a miniature French-Gothic chateau squeezed into the urban context". Architectural historian Andrew Dolkart said of the Sinclair House in 2020, "The corner chateau, for example, both fits in and stands out." He praised the "whimsical details", including what he described as "the carved dragon fish in the railings and those figures in funny hats holding up the windows".

See also
 List of National Historic Landmarks in New York City
 National Register of Historic Places listings in Manhattan from 59th to 110th Streets

Notes and references

Explanatory notes

References

Sources

External links

 Ukrainian Institute of America

C. P. H. Gilbert buildings
Fifth Avenue
Gothic Revival architecture in New York (state)
Houses completed in 1899
Houses in Manhattan
Houses on the National Register of Historic Places in Manhattan
National Historic Landmarks in Manhattan
Sinclair Oil Corporation
Upper East Side
Gilded Age mansions